Arti (also spelled Aarti, Aarthi or Arati) is a Hindu feminine given name, derived from the ritual with the same name. Notable people with the name include:

 Aarathi (born 1954), Indian Kannada-language actress and director
 Aarthi (actress), actress
 Aarthi Agarwal (1984–2015), Indian-American actress
 Arati Ankalikar-Tikekar (born 1963), Indian classical singer
 Aarti Bajaj, Indian film editor
 Arti Cameron (born 1988), Guyanese model
 Aarti Chhabria (born 1982), Indian actress and model
 Arti Dhand (21st century), Canadian novelist
 Aarti Mann (born 1978), Indian-American actress
 Aarti Gupta, Indian teenage model
 Arti Mehra (21st century), Indian politician
 Aarti Mukherji, Indian Bengali-language playback singer
 Aarti Nayak (born 1983), Indian classical vocalist
 Arati Prabhakar (born 1959), American engineer and head of DARPA
 Aarti Puri, Indian actress and model 
 Aarthie Ramaswamy (born 1981), Indian chess-player
 Arati Saha (1940–1994), Indian swimmer
 Aarti Sequeira (born 1978), Indian chef and television personality
 Aarti Shrivastava (born 1983), Indian documentary film-maker
 Aarti Singh, Indian television actress
 Arati Vaidya (born 1970), Indian cricketer

Hindu given names
Indian feminine given names